was a Japanese filmmaker. He was born in Kameyama, Mie Prefecture and died in Kyoto. Kinugasa won the 1954 Palme d'or at the Cannes Film Festival for Gate of Hell.

Biography
Kinugasa began his career as an onnagata (actor specializing in female roles) at the Nikkatsu studio. When Japanese cinema began using actresses in the early 1920s, he switched to directing and worked for producers such as Shozo Makino, before becoming independent to make his best-known film, A Page of Madness (1926). It was considered lost for 45 years until the director rediscovered it in his shed in 1971. A silent film, Kinugasa released it with a new print and score to world acclaim. He also directed the film Crossroads in 1928. He directed jidaigeki at the Shochiku studios, where he helped establish the career of Chōjirō Hayashi (later known as Kazuo Hasegawa). After the war, he helmed big-budget costume productions for Daiei studios.

On February 26, 1982, Kinugasa died at the age of 86.

Selected filmography
 1925: Tsukigata Hanpeita
 1926: A Page of Madness
 1928: Crossroads
 1935: An Actor's Revenge a.k.a. The Revenge of Yukinojo
 1946: Aru yo no Tonosama
 1952: Dedication of the Great Buddha
 1953: Gate of Hell
 1955: The Romance of Yushima a.k.a. The White Sea of Yushima
 1956: Tsukigata Hanpeita: Hana no maki; Arashi no maki
 1957: A Fantastic Tale of Naruto
 1957: A Girl Isn't Allowed to Love
 1957: Floating Vessel
 1958: The Snowy Heron
 1958: Symphony of Love
 1963: ''Bronze Magician'

References

Further reading

External links
 
 
 Teinosuke Kinugasa's grave

1896 births
1982 deaths
Japanese film directors
Samurai film directors
People from Mie Prefecture
Directors of Best Foreign Language Film Academy Award winners
Directors of Palme d'Or winners
Actors from Mie Prefecture